Just as I Am is the debut album by Australian singer Guy Sebastian.

Given the relative popularity of Australian Idol in late 2003, BMG Australia subsequently contracted Sebastian for a record before Christmas 2003. He wanted to record a mixture of pop and R&B material. Guy Sebastian co-wrote three of the songs on the album "All I Need Is You", "I 4 U" and "Something Don't Feel Right". He says on his web page: "I think the credibility in having your own stuff makes you as an artist. Credibility is what I've always strived for and I couldn't imagine my first record not having one of my songs on it." The album also features cover versions of "What a Wonderful World" by Louis Armstrong, "Can You Stand the Rain" by New Edition and "When Doves Cry" by Prince.

Commercial performance
The first single from the album, "Angels Brought Me Here", debuted at number one having set a record for first week single sales for a debut for an Australian artist and was the highest selling single in Australia in 2003. "Angels Brought Me Here" went on to earn five platinum accreditations and win the 2004 ARIA for Highest Selling Single. The song also reached #1 in four Asian countries and New Zealand. In January 2010 it was announced as the highest selling song of the previous decade by ARIA, finishing ahead of Anthony Callea's cover version of "The Prayer".

Just as I Am was released in December 2003 and debuted at number one on the Australian album charts selling 163,711 copies in its first week. This remains the second highest ever one week sales for any album in ARIA chart history. Just as I Am became the 5th highest selling album in Australia in 2003 within three weeks of release. It reached 6× platinum, and eventually sold in excess of 480,000 units. It received a nomination for highest selling album at the 2004 ARIA Awards. Just as I Am places #28 on ARIA's list of highest selling albums of the last decade, the 9th highest entry for an Australian artist, and the highest for an Australian Idol contestant. The second single "All I Need Is You" also debuted at number one in the Australian charts and was accredited platinum. Just as I Am was also released in New Zealand, where it peaked at #3 and achieved double platinum accreditation.

Track listing

Charts

Weekly charts

Year-end charts

Decade-end charts

Certification

Release history

References

External links
 Guy Sebastian home page
 Guy Sebastian album page

2003 debut albums
Guy Sebastian albums
Sony Music Australia albums
19 Recordings albums